Zum zum zum n° 2 is a 1969 musicarello film directed by Bruno Corbucci, it is the sequel to the film Zum zum zum - La canzone che mi passa per la testa.

Plot
Tony, who is to marry Rosalia, falls in love with the beautiful Valeria and chaos ensures.

Cast

Little Tony as Tony
 as Rosalia
Dolores Palumbo as Tosca
Paolo Panelli as Omino Col Singhiozzo
Peppino De Filippo as Peppino Bertozzini
Eva Thulin as Valeria
Orietta Berti as Suor Teresa
 Walter Brugiolo  as Carletto Bertozzini
Enzo Cannavale as Filippo
Nino Terzo as Filiberto Caputo
Carlo Delle Piane as Nando 
Stelvio Rosi as Gianni 
 Elvira Tonelli as Donna Laura
Valeria Sabel as Stefania
Luca Sportelli as Sor Ignazio
Lino Banfi as Pasquale
Pippo Baudo as himself
Bruno Canfora as himself

Reception 
The film received poor critical response. A review from Avvenire described the film as "a cloying alternation of ditties, sentimental intrigues, and comic sketches" in which "a reassuring cartoonish banality triumphs on all fronts". An Italian review of the time found the screenplay "elementary” and the filming and  acting ’”inappropriate” Paolo Mereghetti described the film as "very weak", with Little Tony not credible in his role and a certain repetitiveness of situations already shown in the first film.

References

External links

Musicarelli
1969 films
Sequel films
1960s Italian films